Parma is a city in Cuyahoga County, Ohio, United States, located on the southern edge of Cleveland. 
As of the 2020 census, its population was 81,146. Parma is the seventh largest city in the state of Ohio, the largest suburb in the state, and the second largest city in Cuyahoga County after Cleveland.

History

Greenbriar (1806–1826)
In 1806, the area that would eventually become Parma and Parma Heights was originally surveyed by Abraham Tappan, a surveyor for the Connecticut Land Company, and was known as Township 6 - Range 13. This designation gave the town its first identity in the Western Reserve. Soon after, Township 6 - Range 13 was commonly referred to as "Greenbriar", supposedly for the rambling bush that grew there. Benajah Fay, his wife Ruth Wilcox Fay, and their ten children, arrivals from Lewis County, New York, were the first settlers in 1816. It was then that Greenbriar, under a newly organized government seat under Brooklyn Township, began attending to its own governmental needs.

Parma Township (1826–1924)
Self-government started to gain in popularity by the time the new Greenbriar settlement contained twenty householders. However, prior to the establishment of the new township, the name Greenbriar was replaced by the name Parma. This was largely due to Dr. David Long who had recently returned from Italy and "impressed with the grandeur and beauty...was reminded of Parma, Italy and...persuaded the early townspeople that the territory deserved a better name than Greenbriar."

Thus, on March 7, 1826, a resolution was passed ordering the construction of the new township. It stated,

On the same day, a public notice was issued to qualified electors by the County Commissioners. They met at the house of Samuel Freeman on April 3, 1826, to elect township officers according to the law. It was then that the first eleven officers were elected to lead the new government.

During this time, Parma Township remained largely agricultural. The first schoolhouse was a log structure built on the hill at the northern corner of what is now Parma Heights Cemetery.  A memorial plate on a stone marks the spot. In 1827, the township was divided into road districts. The Broadview Road of today was then known as Town Line Road as well as Independence Road. Ridge Road was known then as Center Road as it cut through the center of town. York Road was then known as York Street as arrivals from the state of New York settled there. Pearl Road then had many names which included Medina Wooster Pike, Wooster Pike, the Cleveland Columbus Road, and the Brighton and Parma Plank Road.

A stone house, built in 1849 and known as the Henninger House, was occupied by several generations of Henningers and is still standing today. The house rests on one of the higher points in Cuyahoga County, which provided visibility for the entire northeastern part of Parma Township. This was also the same site where the Erie Indians, centuries before, stood to read and send fire signals as well as pray to their spirits.

By 1850, the US census listed Parma Township's population at 1,329. However, the rising population of the township had slowed over the decades. The Civil War affected Parma much as it did other towns and villages in the nation. Three out of four homes sent a father, sons, or sometimes both, to fight in the war. By 1910, the population of the township had increased to 1,631.

In 1911, Parma Heights, due to the temperance mood of the day, separated itself from the Parma Township after by a vote of 42 to 32 and was incorporated as a village comprising 4.13 square miles.

 "A main reason for establishing the village of Parma Heights was to get a town marshal...There is one saloon in the territory...some pretty rough crowds Sundays have disturbed the quiet of the neighborhood...wanted it closed on Sundays. To do this they wished a town marshal. They couldn't have a town marshal without becoming a village, so they became one."

The Village of Parma (1924–1930)
By 1920, the US census showed Parma Township had a population of just 2,345, but the following decade proved to be a time of significant growth and development for Parma. It was in the 1920s that Parma Township transformed from a farming community into a village. On December 15, 1924, Parma was incorporated as a village.

The largest and fastest growing development of that time was H. A. Stahl's Ridgewood Gardens development, which started in 1919, continued through the 1920s, and into the 1930s. A resident of Shaker Heights, Ohio's first Garden City, H. A. Stahl developed Ridgewood as an ambitious "model village" project patterned along the lines of and rivaling the earlier Shaker Heights project with "churches, schools, motion picture theater, community house, and other features forming a part of all well-developed residence communities". Ridgewood was designed and marketed as a Garden City on 1,000 acres of land to accommodate about 40,000 residents "325 feet above Lake Erie, in the healthiest section of the South Side, free from the smoke of industries, or the congestion and noises of sections nearer the Public Square."

The City of Parma (1931–present)
On January 1, 1931, Parma became a city with a population of 13,899. Whereas the incorporation of the village of Parma was met with much optimism, the newly established city of Parma faced the uncertainty of the Great Depression which had almost entirely stopped its growth. Money was scarce, tax income was limited, and some began to talk of annexation of both the city and school district to Cleveland. Both annexation issues, however, were soundly defeated as Parma voters overwhelmingly voted against them and silenced proponents of annexation. Not long after this, Parma was once again solvent due in large part to the newly created Gallagher Act, a 1936 Ohio law that aided cities threatened with bankruptcy and the determination of Parma's Auditor, Sam Nowlin. By 1941, a building boom appeared to be underway in Parma just as the United States was about to enter World War II.

After World War II, Parma once again began to experience tremendous growth as young families began moving from Cleveland into the suburbs. Between 1950 and 1960, Parma's population soared from 28,897 to 82,845. By 1956, Parma was unchallenged as the fastest growing city in the United States. The population peaked in 1970 at 100,216.

In 1973, a court found that Parma violated the Fair Housing Act by defeating a proposed fair housing resolution, by blocking every effort to build public and low-income housing, and by having elected officials state publicly they were opposed to blacks moving into Parma.

In 2016, Parma's population had declined to 81,601, though it remains one of the Cleveland area's top three destinations young adults (aged 22 to 34) are increasingly choosing as a place to live, along with Lakewood and downtown Cleveland and in 2016 was recognized by Businessweek as one of the best places to raise kids in Ohio.

Geography
Parma is southwest of Cleveland; it is bounded by Cleveland and Brooklyn on the north, Brooklyn Heights, and Seven Hills on the east, North Royalton and Broadview Heights on the south, and Brook Park, Middleburg Heights, and Parma Heights on the west.

Two major changes and developments have recently occurred regarding two principal sites within the city:
The West Creek Preservation Agency has worked to preserve various historic and natural sites in the city, including the Henninger House and the West Creek Watershed.
Henninger House, built in 1849 and the oldest standing home in Parma, is planned to be part of the proposed Quarry Creek Historic District.

Surrounding communities
Parma is bounded by Cleveland and Brooklyn on the north, Brooklyn Heights, and Seven Hills on the east, North Royalton and Broadview Heights on the south, and Brook Park, Middleburg Heights, and Parma Heights on the west.

Demographics

2020 census
According to the 2020 United States census, Parma had a population of 81,146. Of which, 82.3% were non-Hispanic White, 6.8% were Hispanic/Latino, 4.0% were non-Hispanic Black, 2.5% were Asian, 4.4% were mixed or other.

2010 census
As of the 2010 United States Census, there were 81,601 people, 34,489 households, and 21,646 families residing in the city. The racial makeup of the city was 93.0% White, 2.3% African American, 0.2% Native American, 1.9% Asian, 1.0% from other races, and 1.6% from two or more races. Hispanic or Latino of any race were 3.6% of the population. According to the 2010 Census., 22.5% were of German ancestry, 17.6% Polish, 14.8% Italian, 13.8% Irish, 7.4% Slovak, 6.7% English, 5.3% Ukrainian, 2.6% French, 2.2% Serbian, 1.9% Czech, 1.4% Arab, and 1.2% of Croatian, Lithuanian, or Russian ancestries. In regard to languages spoken, 87.03% spoke English, 2.26% Ukrainian, 1.68% Polish, 1.27% Spanish, 1.24% German, and 1.18% Italian as their first language.

There were 34,489 households, of which 27.1% had children under the age of 18 living with them, 45.7% were married couples living together, 12.4% had a female householder with no husband present, 4.6% had a male householder with no wife present, and 37.2% were non-families. 31.8% of all households were made up of individuals, and 12.9% had someone living alone who was 65 years of age or older. The average household size was 2.34 and the average family size was 2.95.

The median age in the city was 41.5 years. 20.4% of residents were under the age of 18; 8.5% were between the ages of 18 and 24; 25.7% were from 25 to 44; 27.7% were from 45 to 64; and 17.7% were 65 years of age or older. The gender makeup of the city was 48.1% male and 51.9% female.

Income
The median income for a household in the city was $50,198, the median income for a family was $60,696 and the mean income for a family was $68,828. The per capita income for the city was $25,064. The poverty rate in the city was 10.2%. This was low in comparison to other large Ohio cities as well as the state's individual poverty rate of 15.4%.

Safety
In 2014, Parma ranked as the third safest city in the United States with a population of 25,000 or more by Neighborhood Scout. In 2014, Parma had a crime index of 90 meaning it was safer than 90% of cities in the United States.

Economy

During the population boom between 1950 and 1980, Parma's commercial sector grew to match its residential sector. Since the 1950s, Parma has fostered the growth of many small businesses and been an operating hub for such well-known companies as General Motors, the Union Carbide Research Center (now GrafTech International-CLOSED as of 2017) and Cox Cable Television.

Commercial districts

The Shoppes at Parma
The Shoppes at Parma, formerly Parmatown Mall, is a commercial shopping district that totals approximately 800,000 square feet. It is located approximately 3 miles south of Cleveland's southern border at the southwest corner of Ridge Road and West Ridgewood Drive in central Cuyahoga County. It is anchored by J.C. Penney, Dick's Sporting Goods, Marc's and Walmart. The mall opened as a shopping plaza in 1956 and was enclosed in the mid-1960s.

Currently, it is owned and managed by Phillip's Edison & Co. and is undergoing extensive redevelopment at an expected cost of more than $70 million.

Redevelopment will transform the commercial center into a pedestrian-friendly community-oriented mall and will include attractive landscaping, new lighting, creation of two tree-lined boulevards, repaving of the parking lots, changing the entire facade of the outdoor shopping strip and medical offices, demolition of the current Macy's and Dick's Sporting Goods buildings, creating a new point of entry to J.C. Penney from West Ridgewood Drive, the construction of six new outbuildings, and the separation of Walmart from the rest of the mall.

Recently, it was announced that a 15-member "Parma Mayor's Town Center Task Force" will be formed to develop a plan for a town center based around the Ridge Road-West Ridgewood Drive intersection that features the Shoppes at Parma, Parma Branch library, University Hospitals Parma Medical Center and City Hall. It will be made up of representatives from various organizations including the Cuyahoga County Public Library, Parma Area Chamber of Commerce, Parma schools and the Cleveland Metroparks' West Creek Reservation.

Ukrainian Village
The Ukrainian Village commercial district is located along State Road between Tuxedo Avenue and Grantwood Drive. This district was designated Ukrainian Village in September, 2009.

This commercial district features a large number of small, family-owned businesses and medical offices, features one of the most "walkable" neighborhoods in Parma, and boasts a traffic count of more than 40,000 vehicles each day at the intersection of State and Snow Roads. This area also hosts the Ukrainian Independence Day parade (August).

In 2013, Parma formed a sister-city relationship with Lviv, Ukraine and is home to Ohio's largest Ukrainian community, the majority of whom are foreign born, with more than twice the number of any other city.

Parma is the seat of the Ukrainian Catholic Eparchy of Saint Josaphat, which was established by Pope John Paul II in 1983.

Polish Village
The Polish Village commercial district is located along Ridge Road between Pearl Road and Thornton Avenue. This district was designated Polish Village on May 1, 2011.

This commercial district features a large number of small, family-owned businesses and medical offices, features one of the most walkable neighborhoods in Parma, and boasts a traffic count of more than 40,000 vehicles each day at the intersection of Ridge and Snow Roads. This area also hosts the Polish Constitution Day parade (May), St. Charles Carnival parade (July), Independence Day parade (July), and Christmas parade (December).

Education

Public schools
The Parma City School District serves Parma, Parma Heights, and Seven Hills.

Elementary schools
Dentzler Elementary School
Green Valley Elementary School
John Muir Elementary School
Parma Park Elementary School
Pleasant Valley Elementary School
Renwood Elementary School
Ridge-Brook Elementary School
Thoreau Park Elementary School

Middle schools
Greenbriar Middle School
Hillside Middle School
Shiloh Middle School

Greenbriar Middle School and Shiloh Middle School are located within Parma's border. Hillside Middle School is located within Seven Hills' border.

High schools
Normandy High School
Parma Senior High School
Valley Forge High School

Parma Senior High School and Normandy High School are located within Parma's border. Valley Forge High School is located within Parma Heights' border.

The District's sports stadium is Byers Field. All three high schools play golf at Ridgewood for their home course. The rivalry that exists between these schools is well documented.

Charter schools
Constellation Schools: Parma Community public charter schools:

Elementary schools
Parma Community Elementary

Middle schools
Parma Community Middle

High schools
Parma Community High

Private schools

Elementary/middle schools
Al Ihsan School Elementary (K-5)
Bethany Christian Elementary School (PK-6)
Bethany Lutheran School (PK-8)
Bethel Christian Academy (PK-8)
Holy Family School (PK-8)
St. Anthony of Padua Elementary School (K-8)
St. Bridget School (PK-8)
St. Charles Borromeo Parish School (PK-8)
St. Columbkille Parish School (PK-8)

High schools
Padua Franciscan (9-12)

Colleges
Bryant & Stratton College 
Cuyahoga Community College Western Campus

Infrastructure

Transportation
Parma's major north–south roads, in order from west to east, are:
 West 130th Street, which forms part of the western border of Parma,
 Chevrolet Boulevard/Stumph Road/York Road,
 Ridge Road (State Route 3),
 West 54th Street
 State Road (State Route 94),
 Broadview Road (State Route 176), which forms part of the eastern boundary of Parma. The State Route 176 designation continues northward via the Jennings Freeway, connecting Parma to downtown Cleveland.

Its major east–west roads, in order from north to south, are:
 I-480, running just north of Parma's northern border,
 Brookpark Road (State Route 17), forming Parma's northern border with Cleveland,
 Snow Road,
 West Ridgewood Drive,
 West Pleasant Valley Road, and
 Sprague Road, which forms the southern border of Parma.

Also, Pearl Road (U.S. Route 42) runs from southwest to northeast through northern Parma for less than two miles (3 km).

Public transportation in Parma includes bus routes operated by the Greater Cleveland Regional Transit Authority, which serves the city of Cleveland and Cuyahoga County suburbs.

Notable people
Bill Balas, screenwriter, director and producer
 Jeremiah Wallace Baldock, Wisconsin State Assemblyman 
 Michael Bierut, graphic designer
 Hector Boiardi, better known as Chef Boyardee, died in Parma in 1985.
 Shya Chitaley, Curator of paleobotany at the Cleveland Museum of Natural History
 Carmen Cozza, football coach at Yale University.
 Timothy DeGeeter, state representative
 Dan Fritsche, NHL player, Minnesota Wild, Columbus Blue Jackets and New York Rangers
 Erich Gliebe, CEO of the white supremacist National Alliance, also professional boxer
 Michael T. Good, NASA astronaut
 Brian Holzinger, NHL, Buffalo Sabres
 James Hoye, umpire in Major League Baseball
 Dan Huberty, Republican member of the Texas House of Representatives
William Kowalski, author and educator
 Ted Levine, actor
 James A. Lovell, NASA Astronaut (Gemini 7, Gemini 12, Apollo 8 and Apollo 13 missions)
 Biagio Messina, television producer, filmmaker, and actor. 
 Mike Mizanin, actor and professional wrestler known under the ring name The Miz
 Clint Nageotte, professional baseball player
 Alex Nedeljkovic, goaltender for the Detroit Red Wings of the NHL.
 Ransom E. Olds, automotive pioneer
Benjamin Orr (Orzechowski), best known as co-lead singer and bassist for The Cars.
 Kermit Poling, conductor, violinist and composer; music director of the South Arkansas Symphony; concertmaster of the Shreveport Symphony Orchestra
 Frank Romano, guitarist, songwriter and record producer
 Alan Ruck, actor (Ferris Bueller's Day Off, Spin City)

In popular culture

Moon Over Parma
In the late 1980s, Bob McGuire penned a song entitled "Moon Over Parma", about an eccentric courtship that traverses the various suburbs of Cleveland. The song first received wide exposure on Big Chuck and Lil' John during its "New Talent Time" segment. Though McGuire was given the shepherd's crook, McGuire's song was offered for free, in the form of sheet music, to those who wrote to the show requesting a copy.

The Drew Carey Show’s opening credits of its first season consisted of a caricature of Drew Carey — consisting of his face and a yellow tie — singing "Moon Over Parma" with an abridgment and some minor lyrical changes.

Parma Place
Occasionally, during the 1960s and 1970s, Parma was the target of light-hearted jabs by local movie show hosts Ghoulardi, Hoolihan, Big Chuck and Lil’ John, and The Ghoul, due to its central European image promoted by the friendly rivalry between Ernie "Ghoulardi" Anderson and "Big Chuck" Schodowski and contrary to actual demographics. Ghoulardi, the horror host of late night Shock Theater at WJW-TV, Channel 8, in Cleveland from January 13, 1963, through December 16, 1966, made a series of shorts called "Parma Place" and focused on an alleged love of white socks, pink flamingos, chrome balls, kielbasa, pierogi and the polka.

Novak v. City of Parma

In March 2016, Anthony Novak, a resident of Parma, created a parody Facebook page superficially resembling the local police department's official page, with outlandish, satirical posts easily distinguished from actual police public-affairs content. Despite the page being voluntarily removed after 12 hours, the Parma Police subsequently obtained warrants and raided Novak's apartment in the middle of the night three weeks later, seizing electronic devices belonging Novak and his roommate, and arresting and jailing Novak for four days until he could make bail. Novak was charged with felony disruption of police operations, but was acquitted at trial; a subsequent lawsuit against the police for civil rights violations was rebuffed by the Sixth Circuit, citing qualified immunity. Novak's appeal to the U.S. Supreme Court garnered legal briefs from the ACLU and Cato Institute, but gained notoriety because of a supporting brief filed by satirical website The Onion.

References

External links

 City of Parma
 Parma Area Chamber of Commerce
 City Data

 
Cities in Ohio
Cities in Cuyahoga County, Ohio
Populated places established in 1816
Italian-American culture in Ohio
Polish-American culture in Ohio
Ukrainian-American culture in Ohio
Ukrainian communities in the United States
Cleveland metropolitan area
1816 establishments in Ohio